Musa lokok is a species of wild banana (genus Musa), native to Sarawak, on the island of Borneo. It is placed in section Callimusa (now including the former section Australimusa), having a diploid chromosome number of 2n = 20.

References

lokok
Endemic flora of Borneo
Flora of Sarawak
Plants described in 2005